Sorbian Americans or Wendish Americans are Americans of Sorb/Wend descent. The largest community of Sorbs in the United States is in Texas, with a population of around 588 Sorbs/Wends.

Notable people

Arthur Fehr
John Kilian
Mato Kósyk
John Symank

See also 
 Sorbians in Texas

References

See also
 Wends of Texas
 Giddings Deutsches Volksblatt

 
European-American society